Metal Magic is the debut studio album by American heavy metal band Pantera, released on June 10, 1983 by Metal Magic Records. Like the band's next three releases, it is musically oriented toward a glam/heavy metal sound influenced by Kiss and Van Halen, rather than the groove metal style they became famous for playing in the 1990s, starting with the release of Cowboys from Hell. The album was released on the band's own label (also called Metal Magic) and produced by Jerry Abbott (under the alias "The Eld'n"), a noted country music songwriter and producer, and father of Diamond Darrell and Vinnie Paul, who were 16 and 19 years old, respectively, at the time of release.

Reception 
In a retrospective review for AllMusic, Eduardo Rivadavia gave Metal Magic a largely negative ranking of 1.5 stars out of a possible 5. He described the album as "exceedingly average hard rock and metal misfires" with only two promising songs in "I'll Be Alright" and "Widowmaker". Furthermore, the album's "strongest asset" even in these early years was Dimebag Darrell's guitar playing.

Track listing 
All credits adapted from the original LP.

Personnel 
Pantera
 Terry Glaze – vocals, rhythm guitar, keyboards
 Diamond Darrell – rhythm and lead guitars
 Rex Rocker – bass
 Vinnie Paul – drums

Production
Jerry Abbott – producer, engineer, mixing
M.C. Rather – mastering
Recorded at Pantego Sound, Pantego, Texas

References 

1983 debut albums
Pantera albums
Self-released albums